James McMillan III (born December 1, 1946) is an American political activist, perennial candidate, and Vietnam War veteran.

McMillan is best known as the founder of the Rent Is Too Damn High Party, a New York-based political party. McMillan has run for office at least six times since 1993, most notably in the 2010 New York gubernatorial election. He declared in December 2010 that he would run in the 2012 U.S. presidential election as a Republican. He did not appear on the ballot in any state and suspended his campaign to return to the Rent Is Too Damn High Party and run for Mayor of New York City in the 2013 election. He attempted to run for governor again in the 2014 election but he did not make the ballot.

McMillan announced his candidacy for the Republican nomination for President of the United States in the 2016 election, but withdrew from the campaign on December 9, 2015. He subsequently announced that he was retiring from politics before endorsing Republican candidate Donald Trump. The Rent Is Too Damn High Party website announced that McMillan would come out of retirement to make a fourth run for governor. His petitions were challenged and ruled invalid in September 2018.

Early life and education

Originally from New Smyrna Beach, Florida, McMillan served in the United States Army during the Vietnam War. After his time in Vietnam, he briefly spent time in the 1970s as an R&B recording artist. McMillan graduated from Barkley Private Security Investigations Academy prior to 1993.

Political career

Early campaigns
McMillan's first run for political office came in 1993, when he ran for Mayor of New York on the Rent Is Too Damn High ticket. In the course of that campaign, McMillan was at one point tied to a tree and doused with gasoline; he later climbed the Brooklyn Bridge and refused to come down from it unless television stations broadcast his message. He was disqualified from the ballot for coming 300 petition signatures short of the 7,500 needed to qualify for the general election ballot.

McMillan next ran for Governor of New York in 1994 by traveling from his home in Brooklyn through upstate New York to Buffalo on foot, staying in homeless shelters along the way; he had planned to walk back to Brooklyn, but an injury in Rochester led to him taking a bus home. When he arrived in Buffalo, the site of the state Democratic convention, McMillan disrupted a speech by incumbent Governor Mario Cuomo at the convention and was thrown out because of it. After failing to collect enough signatures to get onto the ballot, he continued in a write-in campaign.

McMillan ran for the United States Senate in the 2000 election in New York but was removed from the ballot.

McMillan qualified for the November general election ballot for Mayor of New York City in 2005 and 2009. In 2005, he received over 4,111 votes (0.32%) and in 2009, he received 2,332 votes (0.2%).

McMillan received 13,355 votes (0.3%) in the 2006 gubernatorial election, coming fifth out of six candidates.

2010 gubernatorial campaign

For the 2010 campaign, McMillan filed petitions to appear on the Democratic primary ballot and the Rent Is Too Damn High line. However, he put very little effort into the Democratic petitions, and the vast majority of the 13,350 signatures bearing his name were collected by Randy Credico, who had partnered with McMillan for a joint Democratic petition. Credico had counted on McMillan to collect 10,000 signatures to put his total at over 20,000, above the 15,000 required to get onto the ballot, but McMillan never followed through, leaving both candidates short of the necessary signatures to force a Democratic primary against state Attorney General Andrew Cuomo, who was thus unopposed. Credico, in response, called McMillan a "jack-off" and a "sorry ass", accusing him of "working against me", "turn[ing] in a wagonload of blank pages and then [leaving] Albany in brand new automobiles." McMillan did file the necessary signatures to get onto the "Rent Is 2 Damn High" line; the petitions were technically invalid because they did not include a lieutenant governor candidate, but McMillan was allowed onto the ballot anyway because nobody challenged the petitions.

During an appearance at a 2010 gubernatorial debate in which McMillan figured prominently, he stated his views on gay marriage, by saying "The Rent Is Too Damn High Party believes that if you want to marry a shoe, I'll marry you." After the debate, McMillan garnered significant attention from the media. The Democratic nominee, Andrew Cuomo responded to one of his statements during this appearance by saying "I'm with Jimmy; the rent is too damn high." The appearance inspired a song by The Gregory Brothers.

McMillan, perceived by many as a protest vote, garnered 41,129 votes (0.88%), enough to finish in fifth place out of seven, compared to winning Andrew Cuomo's 2.5 million votes and second-place Carl Paladino's 1.4 million votes. McMillan gained almost as many votes as Libertarian Party candidate Warren Redlich (48,359 votes), and nearly double the votes of Anti-Prohibition Party candidate Kristin M. Davis (20,421 votes).

Regarding his use of black gloves during the debate, "I'm a war vet," McMillan said. "Don't forget I was in Vietnam for two and half years and I have three Bronze Stars, but the chemicals of Agent Orange — dioxin and a lot of other chemicals mixed up — I would get sick. When I get home tonight, I know I'm not going to be able to breathe if I take them off. It could be psychological, I don't know, but I just put em on and wear them anyway."

McMillan's gubernatorial campaign was the subject of an independent, feature-length documentary titled DAMN!. Filmmakers Aaron Fisher-Cohen and Kristian Almgren documented McMillan throughout his campaign for Governor of New York, as well as the events immediately following McMillan's loss of the election. The film was an official selection at the Little Rock Film Festival in Arkansas, as well as at the Brooklyn Film Festival, but did not officially premiere until August 2011.

2012 presidential campaign
McMillan was a registered member of the Democratic Party. Then, on December 23, 2010, he said that he would switch parties and run as a Republican in the 2012 U.S. presidential election, to avoid a primary challenge from President Barack Obama. He also campaigned with performance artist and activist Vermin Supreme and appeared as Supreme's presidential running mate in the 2014 documentary about Supreme's 2012 presidential campaign, Who Is Vermin Supreme? An Outsider Odyssey, directed by Steve Onderick. McMillan and Supreme made a pact, each agreeing to act as vice president for the other if either were elected. He believes that his greatest political strengths include a mastery of social media, an ability to pinch pennies, and inimitable political vision.

McMillan appeared at the Conservative Political Action Conference in February 2011. He also appeared at Northeastern University in March 2011, through the Political Science Student Association, where he discussed key issues. McMillan campaigned during the Occupy Wall Street protests, criticizing the protesters for voting for the wrong person but defending the protesters' right to protest. On November 15, 2011, McMillan held court on the 23rd floor of the Financial Industry Regulatory Authority offices kibbitzing with his legal staff and media representatives. McMillan was the keynote speaker at Occupy Tenafly on May Day 2012. There, he told protesters that college tuition is also "too damn high".

He was not invited to any of the Republican debates and did not appear on any primary ballots. However, he did appear in a debate against comedian Conner Ratliff on The Chris Gethard Show, a public access program in New York City. Ratliff was also running for president on the platform of him being old enough to be elected president. On September 13, 2012, McMillan suspended his candidacy to run for Mayor of New York City in the 2013 election, and endorsed President Barack Obama.

2013 mayoral campaign

McMillan announced his fourth campaign for Mayor of New York City on September 13, 2012. On April 24, 2013, McMillan released a song and video called "Rent Is Too Damn High" on YouTube. In the song, McMillan raps about the problems of the American economy. In one part of the song, he says, "Rent and the deficit is too damn high. Poverty and unemployment both up in the sky. Wages and education is too damn low, economic recovery is too damn slow." McMillan's video received over 300,000 views in its two first days after being uploaded.

McMillan endorsed Anthony Weiner in the Democratic primary. In the general election, McMillan received 1,990 votes (0.18%).

2014 gubernatorial campaign

On May 22, 2014, McMillan announced his intentions to again run for Governor of New York. However, his petition to be on the ballot was challenged, and he was later thrown off the ballot by the state board of elections, which claimed his petition contained too many photocopied pages to meet the signature threshold.

Subsequently, McMillan endorsed the Libertarian Party candidate, Michael McDermott, for governor.

2017 City Council campaign
McMillan ran for New York City Council in 2017 as a Republican. He lost to Carlina Rivera, a Democrat, finishing second with 12% of the vote.

2018 gubernatorial campaign
McMillan announced another run for governor in 2018, accusing then-incumbent Andrew Cuomo and the Moreland Commission of violating federal civil rights laws. He submitted his petitions on August 21. They were challenged and ruled invalid in September.

Political positions
McMillan's political positions are populist.

McMillan has expressed opposition to federal bailouts, specifically the Wall Street Bailout of 2008 and the Obama Administration's bailout of General Motors. Referencing the bailout and his presidential run, he said of Obama: "If you don't do your job right, I am coming at you."
McMillan believes that global warming is a natural occurrence that occurs every 15,000 years. He disputes the idea that it is caused by man and pollution, saying he "isn't buying [the] punk science" of Al Gore.
A supporter of same-sex marriage, McMillan joked in the 2010 gubernatorial debate he would allow marriage between a person and a shoe. After the Marriage Equality Act passed, McMillan stated of same-sex couples, "Now you don’t have to marry a shoe, you can marry somebody."
On transgender people, McMillan says "When you see a guy walk down the street and he’s got a little skirt on, and he’s so happy. Why shouldn’t you be happy? This is America, it’s beautiful to watch someone different."
On sexual expression, McMillan says "We all are freaky. He (Anthony Weiner) just exposed his freaky-ism in the wrong way." McMillan, in regard to Weiner's infidelity and sexual communications, considered them a "marketing bonanza".
McMillan, as founder of the Rent Is Too Damn High Party, is against high rent and property taxes for homeowners. He believes that lowering rent and cutting taxes will ease financial stress and help eradicate hunger and poverty, as well as raise tax revenue. He surmises that reducing rent would "create 3 to 6 million jobs" by freeing up capital to give businesses a chance to hire people. He also favors tax credits for commuters.
McMillan and the party are in favor of writing off all taxes owed to the state, consolidating the rent boards in New York, seizure of unoccupied apartment buildings, reforming the state court system, and free college tuition.
McMillan is in favor of having fixed rate of low rent across America, which would be the same regardless of property value. He states that adjusting the rent for property value "is a bunch of crap" and "a scheme to run out the poor".
McMillan and the party oppose any spending cuts to education or elderly care services.
Of his potential Republican opponents for the Presidential nomination, he thinks of Newt Gingrich as a "good liar" in the vein of John Edwards and that "people look at him and laugh", Mitt Romney as a "good-looking guy [that] will keep the ladies from looking at me". He has also stated that he loves Sarah Palin and holds a strongly negative view of former New York City mayor Michael Bloomberg. He views former governor Andrew Cuomo as a do-nothing and former New Jersey Governor Chris Christie as "just a big mouth (...) New Jersey is crumbling just like every state in the union."

Personal life
Originally from New Smyrna Beach, Florida, McMillan is single and has two adult children. His eldest child, his daughter, McMillan claims developed disabilities as a result of his exposure to Agent Orange, and his younger son (James McMillan IV) served in the U.S. military. The elder McMillan served in the United States Army during the Vietnam War. After his time in Vietnam, he briefly spent time in the 1970s as an R&B recording artist; he claims to have spent a brief time at Brunswick Records before leaving the label to do independent work. McMillan graduated from Barkley Private Security Investigations Academy prior to 1993. McMillan has worked as a male stripper, has smoked marijuana in the past, and considers Deep Throat his favorite film.

According to an interview with the New York Times, McMillan does not currently pay rent on a Flatbush apartment he has claimed as his residence and he has not done so since the 1980s. His landlord apparently allows him to reside in his apartment for free in exchange for performing maintenance work on his apartment building. He had previously told the Wall Street Journal that he pays rent of $800 a month for his apartment, but told the New York Times that he definitely did not pay rent. He pays the rent for an apartment McMillan shares with his son in the East Village in Manhattan, which is $900 per month under current rent controls. The landlord of the East Village apartment is moving to evict McMillan on the grounds that McMillan lives in the Flatbush apartment and not in the East Village one; McMillan, who has held the East Village apartment lease since 1977, claims that the Flatbush apartment is not his residence but instead an office for the Rent Is Too Damn High Party.

As of October 2022, McMillan was living in a nursing home in Queens.

In popular culture
McMillan was portrayed by Kenan Thompson in the Weekend Update segment of the sketch comedy show Saturday Night Live on October 23, 2010. Thompson, as McMillan, kept saying "the rent is too damn high" in response to most of the questions put to him. He also referred to himself as a billy goat and "the black Lorax," and said that, if elected, he would be the country's "last black President." The real McMillan praised the portrayal, saying that "that put me over the top... this election is over. Jimmy's gonna win it."

A character parodying McMillan was portrayed in Season 3 Episode 7 of Rick and Morty, "The Ricklantis Mixup".

McMillan's tagline has been quoted by several prominent New Yorkers, including Ritchie Torres and Matthew Yglesias.

In media
McMillan guest starred in the music video for 'Punx Not Dead, I am' by Morning Glory.

References

External links
Jimmy McMillan for NYC Mayor in 2013 official campaign website
 

1946 births
Living people
African-American people in New York (state) politics
African-American Christians
American male erotic dancers
United States Army personnel of the Vietnam War
Leaders of political parties
Politicians from New York City
New York (state) Democrats
New York (state) Republicans
People from New Smyrna Beach, Florida
United States Army soldiers
Candidates in the 1996 United States presidential election
20th-century American politicians
Candidates in the 2012 United States presidential election
Candidates in the 2016 United States presidential election
21st-century American politicians
People from Flatbush, Brooklyn
African-American candidates for President of the United States
People from the East Village, Manhattan
American political party founders
20th-century African-American politicians
21st-century African-American politicians